The Chienchen River is a river in Kaohsiung, Taiwan.

History
The river used to be very dirty what it was once called the Black Dragon River. In 2004, Kaohsiung Mayor Frank Hsieh took the initiative to clean the river for four years with a budget of NT$2 billion. In August 2009, Typhoon Morakot caused flooding in areas adjacent to the river.

Transportation
Part of the river is accessible from Cianjhen Senior High School Station of Kaohsiung MRT.

See also
 List of rivers of Taiwan

References

Rivers of Taiwan
Landforms of Kaohsiung